USS Washington was a lateen-rigged, two-masted galley in the service of the Continental Congress during the American Revolutionary War. Washington was capable of propulsion by sail or by the rowing of oarsmen. During a battle with British warships, Washington "struck her colors" and was captured by the British.

Built on Lake Champlain

The third ship to be named Washington, a lateen-rigged, two-masted galley, was built on Lake Champlain at Skenesboro, New York, in the autumn of 1776. On 6 October 1776, the galley joined the small fleet established and commanded by Brigadier General Benedict Arnold.

Design

She was armed with two 18-pounder long gun, two 12-pounder long gun, two 9-pounder guns, four 6-pounder guns, one 2-pounder gun, and eight swivel guns. Trumbull had a crew of 80 men.

Service history

Battle of Valcour Island

 
Washington, commanded by Brigadier General David Waterbury, Arnold's second in command—was among Arnold's ships that anchored in the lee of Valcour Island to await the expected English move.

When that lakeward push began, Capt. Thomas Pringle, of the Royal Navy, led a 25-ship fleet past Valcour Island on 11 October. Pringle sighted the American fleet after he had passed it and attacked from leeward. In the ensuing action, Washington suffered the heaviest damage of any ship in Arnold's fleet; Waterbury, her commander, subsequently reported that she was

 
Arnold regrouped his shattered fleet and slipped past the British on 12 October with muffled oars, the Americans slipping noiselessly past Pringle's fleet in a desperate attempt at escape. However, after a long chase, the British caught the retreating Continental force the following day, on 13 October, at Split Rock near Crown Point.

After the battle
 
Arnold managed to beach and destroy four of the galleys and his own flagship, while most of the remaining ships escaped upriver. Only Washington, at the rear of the van, was captured by the enemy; she struck her colors, as Arnold reported later, " ... after receiving a few broadsides."

Final disposition
 
Washington was eventually taken into British service, apparently retaining her name, and was re-rigged as a brig. Her subsequent fate, however, is unrecorded.

Citations

Bibliography 

Online resources

Further reading

External links

 

Ships built in New York (state)
Ships of the Continental Navy
Row galleys of the Continental Navy
1776 ships
Lake Champlain
Ships named for Founding Fathers of the United States